Naranganam  is a village in Pathanamthitta district in the state of Kerala, India. It is home to Madathumpadi Devi Temple.  Nearby places include Kozhencherry, Mylapra, Kadamananitta and Vazhakunnam.

Demographics
 India census, Naranganam had a population of 17749 with 8398 males and 9351 females.

Writers and Important personalities 
Kadammanitta Ramakrishnan, Kadammanitta Vasudevan apillai, Prof.Nellikkal Muralidharan, Kuzhithadathil Gopalakrishnan nair,K.R.Gopinadhan Nair[kuzhithadathil house],Adv.N.G.Chacko Ex.MLA,Pareethu Rauthar Ex MLA, Lipin Raj, Civil Servant & Writer, K.G.Ajith kumar[Saindhava books]

References

Villages in Pathanamthitta district